The Seneca Nation of Indians is a federally recognized Seneca tribe based in western New York. They are one of three federally recognized Seneca entities in the United States, the others being the Tonawanda Band of Seneca (also in western New York) and the Seneca-Cayuga Nation of Oklahoma. Some Seneca also live with other Iroquois peoples on the Six Nations of the Grand River in Ontario.

The Seneca Nation has three reservations, two of which are occupied: Cattaraugus Reservation, Allegany Indian Reservation, and the mostly unpopulated Oil Springs Reservation. It has two alternating capitals on the two occupied reservations: Irving at Cattaraugus Reservation, and Jimerson Town near Salamanca on the Allegany Reservation. The tribe also claims sovereignty over a portion of the Canawaugus settlement as of 2022, which is not federally recognized. An additional territory de facto governed by the nation, the Cornplanter Tract in Pennsylvania, officially expired in 1957 and was submerged by the construction of the Allegheny Reservoir in 1965.

Government
The government of this tribe was established in 1848 by a Constitutional Convention of Seneca Indians residing on the Allegany and Cattaraugus Territories in present-day New York. The Seneca Nation of Indians Constitution established a tri-partite governing structure based on general elections of 16 Councilors, three Executives (President, Treasurer, Clerk), and Court justices (Surrogates and Peacemakers).  These elections are held every two years, on the first Tuesday in November, usually concurrent with Election Day in the United States (the exception is in years when November 1 is a Tuesday; in those years, the Seneca Nation holds their election on November 1 while the U.S. holds their elections November 8). The leadership rotates between the two reservations each election, and no officer can serve consecutive terms because of this. There are no other term limits, and elected officers can serve numerous nonconsecutive terms.

The Council has established rules for membership or citizenship within the nation. In the 21st century, the Seneca Nation of Indians in New York has a total enrolled population of nearly 8,000 citizens. Its territories are generally rural, with several residential areas. Many Seneca citizens live off-territory, and some are located across the States, as well as in other countries. Off-territory residents, who often work in removed urban areas that provide more jobs, comprise nearly 1/2 of the enrolled citizens. These off-territory members are eligible to vote and are often bussed in during elections.

The Seneca Nation's republican form of government stands in contrast to that of the federally recognized Tonawanda Band of Seneca Indians. That band of the Seneca retained its traditional government of hereditary chiefs chosen by clan mothers from the maternal lines responsible for such leadership. Within the Senaca Nation, such hereditary leaders were deposed in the 1848 convention of the Seneca Nation of New York. Followers of the traditional government structure split off and organized the Tonawanda Band, later gaining federal recognition.

Women were denied the right to vote in Seneca elections until the early 1960s. The tribe's male voters had rejected female suffrage in three consecutive referendums in the 1950s, all rejected with widespread opposition from the Allegany Reservation, before the referendum passed.

Politics
Since the late 20th century, the Seneca government is reported to be primarily under one-party rule, with the Seneca Party having control of the political process. In 2011, the Seneca Party was reported by The Buffalo News as having bribed people for votes and bussed voters in from out of state during elections. The party also controls human resources management in the nation's various enterprises, allowing them to hire people for patronage jobs and fire people for political dissent. Opposing political parties have accused the party of electoral malfeasance through violating the secret ballot.

According to J.C. Seneca, a former Seneca Party politician who defected from the party in 2014, the ruling class has ensured that only the Seneca Party has had enough candidates to qualify for straight-ticket voting in which voters can select all of a party's candidates for office with a single ballot mark by intimidating candidates from other parties out of the race, and on election day, poll workers eavesdrop upon voters by timing how long it takes to cast a ballot. In years past, the nation has used lever-action voting machines, a process that will be replaced as of 2016 by scanned paper ballots, If a poll worker heard a voter depress more than one lever, or take too long to complete their ballot, they could report this back to the Seneca Party bosses, who could then punish the voter by denying them jobs or seizing their homes. There have been numerous factions and disputes within the Seneca Party; tensions increased during the presidency of attorney Robert Odawi Porter in 2010-2012. Supporters of Porter were at odds with supporters of the John family, an old-line, politically powerful family in Seneca circles. In the years following Porter's lone term, the disputes have mostly been settled.

In November 2011, the John family led a vote to depose Porter by stripping him of most of his powers and give the title of chief executive officer to Michael "Spike" John. He is the cousin of Maurice "Moe" John, who served as Seneca president from 2006 to 2008, and ran unsuccessfully for Seneca President against Porter in 2010. Diane Kennedy, Tribal Clerk and a Porter ally, invalidated this vote under conflict of interest statutes. In an October 2012 Council Session, a close friend of Kennedy said that Porter wrote the invalidation letter for Kennedy to sign. The action for de facto impeachment was taken after John supporters said politically motivated charges were made against Susan Abrams, a John ally.

The 2012 elections were marked by a split in the Seneca Party and one of the most wide-open (and bitterly contested) Seneca elections in several years: five candidates competed for the post of president, including two endorsed by the two major factions in the Seneca Party. Barry E. Snyder Sr., a John ally who had previously served several other terms as President (including the one immediately before Porter), was re-elected to the post in 2012.

On November 4, 2014, with 66% of the vote, Maurice "Moe" John of the Seneca Party was elected to serve as President of the Seneca Nation of Indians. John faced council member Darlene Miller, who ran on the One Nation Party ticket. The Seneca Party had a landslide victory in the 2014 Elections; Todd Gates was elected Treasurer, and Pauline "Snap" John was elected Clerk. Elected to the Council were Ross L. John Sr., Llona LeRoy, outgoing President Barry Snyder, John Adlai Williams Jr., all of the Cattaraugus Territory. Tina Abrams, Rickey Armstrong, William "Billy" Canella and Stephen Gordon were elected to the Council from the Allegany Territory.

The Seneca Party nominated then Treasurer/CFO, Todd Gates, as its nominee for President in September 2016, spurning Barry Snyder's efforts at a sixth term; Snyder, a supporter of the party machine, endorsed Gates, who faced challengers J.C. Seneca and Sally Snow.
 The Seneca Nation elections took place on November 1, 2016. Gates defeated candidates J.C. Seneca and Sally Snow for President. Outgoing President Maurice "Moe" John was elected Treasurer, Lenith Waterman was elected Clerk. Elected to Council were Linda "Soupy" Doxtator, Jeffrey Gill, Arlene Bova Michael Williams, Presley Redeye, Keith White, Al E. George and Timothy Waterman.

In the 2018 Seneca Nation elections, Rickey L. Armstrong Sr., a Nation Councilor since 2014 and a past Seneca Nation President from 2002-2004, received the Seneca Party nomination for President along with Matthew Pagels for Treasurer, and Bethany Johnson for Clerk. Armstrong defeated independent candidate Stephen L. Maybee with over 89% of the vote in the November 6th, 2018 general election. The Seneca Party won all Seneca Nation offices, Councilors elected were Tina Abrams, William Canella, Josh Jimerson, Angie Kennedy, Llona LeRoy, Robert W. Jones, Ross John Sr., and John Adlai Williams Jr. Andrew Keyes and Brandon Crouse were elected Chief Marshals; Darby LeRoy, Cheyne Jimerson, Rory Wheeler, Josh Becker, Christopher Bova, and Randy White were elected Marshals.

The 2020 Seneca Nation election featured a across the board sweep by the Seneca Party, who endorsed Matthew Pagels for President, Rickey Armstrong Sr., for Treasurer, and Marta Kettle for Clerk. They defeated the Senecas for Change 2020 ticket led by presidential candidate and businesswoman Sally Snow, newcomer treasurer candidate Karen Johnson Veeraswamy, clerk candidate and former court of appeals judge Julie Snow, and Independent treasurer candidate Stephen Maybee. Elected to the council from the Allegany Territory were longtime council members Al E. George, Arlene Bova, outgoing marshal Josh Becker, and former Seneca Nation Health System president/chief executive officer, Tim Waterman. Councilors elected from the Cattaraugus Territory were the Seneca’s environmental director, Lisa Maybee, current councilor and fire chief of the Nation’s volunteer fire department, Presley Redeye, deputy chief of staff to the treasurer, Eliot “Chub” Jimerson, current councilor and former chief marshal, Keith White.

Economic development
The tribe owns and operates the Seneca Buffalo Creek Casino, located in Buffalo.  Other gaming and resort properties include the Seneca Allegany Casino in Salamanca and Seneca Niagara Casino in Niagara Falls.

The Seneca Nation also owns Seneca Gaming and Entertainment, a chain of small video slots and bingo facilities with locations in Irving, Salamanca, and on the Oil Spring Reservation in Cuba.

Through a tribal-owned holding company, the tribe owns a telecommunications firm, Seneca Telecommunications; and a construction management company, SCMC LLC. Under the presidency of Robert Odawi Porter, the tribe began pursuing diversification of the Nation's businesses. It promoted founding of new Seneca-owned businesses beyond the Nation's traditional strongholds of gasoline retail and tobacco products. In 2010 the tribe acquired a controlling interest in wireless and telecommunications provider CT COMM, based in Washington, D.C. From 2010 to 2021, Seneca Holding also owned and operated Seneca Broadcasting LLC, which operated radio station WGWE. The Seneca Nation sold WGWE to Paul Izard shortly after shutting the station down but failed to disclose problems with the station's transmitter or terms in WGWE's broadcast tower lease, prompting Izard to quickly donate the station to Family Life Network and accuse the Seneca Nation and the tower owner of malfeasance.

The tribe has developed a brand of cigarettes called Native Pride.  The tribe also owns a small chain of smoke shops and gas stations under the "Seneca One Stop" brand, but the vast majority of smoke shops on Seneca reservations are independently owned. The refusal of Seneca businesses to pay New York state excise taxes, because their businesses are operated on sovereign land, has given them a price advantage over non-Seneca, to whom the Seneca refuse to grant equal rights on their territory. The issue of such excise taxes has been a source of controversy between the tribes and the state government and non-Seneca convenience store operators in the vicinity for several decades.

Seneca Pumped Storage Project at Kinzua Dam
For decades, the Seneca developed their land primarily for agricultural and related uses. The floodplain along the river was highly fertile. In the 1960s, members of the tribe became increasingly politically active. This was related to asserting sovereignty as part of a general Native American activism in this period and, specifically, to try to defeat proposals by the United States Army Corps of Engineers to take thousands of acres of reservation land as part of construction of Kinzua Dam, a flood-control project on the River.

While alternatives existed, the federal government's study concluded that these were not viable. The COE proceeded with the project: construction of the dam and associated reservoir. The project caused huge losses for the tribe, taking 10,000 acres of their reservation, nearly one third of their total property and much of it the most fertile farmland. More than 600 families were displaced and relocated. The tribe received a few hundred acres and relocation assistance for these families, as well as the relocation of a burial ground. They consider these to be insufficient compensation for the government's violating a 1794 treaty that guaranteed the tribe control of this reservation. In addition, the project has since caused other flooding on their land and a through road, causing the loss of additional fertile areas.

In the aftermath of the dam's completion, the Seneca people developed a different political dynamic. As the tribe used some compensation monies to support higher education for its members, the 1960s crisis indirectly resulted in a "college-educated generation, some of whom now work in tribal government making major contributions to the nation’s present and future." Other young people have left the reservation to get better jobs in other areas.

In a major action, in 2010 the Nation filed an application with the Federal Energy Regulatory Commission (FERC) to take over operations of the hydropower works, the Seneca Pumped Storage Project at Kinzua Dam. Robert Odawi Porter, president of the tribe, said this would not only help the tribe to diversify its economy, but be a means of compensation for environmental and property losses that accompanied flooding of 10,000 acres of tribal areas after the dam was constructed in 1965. The operator at the time, FirstEnergy of Toledo, Ohio, had a license that was set to expire in 2015. The private sector is estimated to have been making $13 million in profits annually from the hydropower.

President Porter has noted that, when the federal dam was proposed, tribal leaders were told only that it was needed for flood control, not that a hydroelectric project would be run there.  In August 2011, the tribe received a preliminary permit from FERC to study "the feasibility of the additional hydropower operations and [it] grants them priority status in filing for the full permit." The Nation was required to work with the U.S. Army Corps of Engineers to obtain documents relevant to adding new generation infrastructure to its dam.

In November 2013, FERC approved FirstEnergy's sale of 11 hydro plants, including that at Kinzua Dam, which was the biggest project, to a unit of independent developer LS Power Group. This did not affect any transfers of operating licenses, which FERC noted were pending separate approvals.

President Porter noted that the dam has generated hundreds of millions of dollars in profits for operators since it started in 1970, but the Seneca have not received any of that money. It also noted that the federal government had licensed the private hydropower project to use the Allegheny Reservoir, but no operator had ever obtained property rights from the Seneca Nation for operation of the dam.

On July 22, 2015, the Commission issued a new 50-year license to Seneca Generation to continue operation of the Kinzua Project, effective December 1, 2015. That year, Seneca Generation sought relief from requirements by federal resource agencies related to measures to protect rare and endangered species below the dam. FERC denied a rehearing and stay requested by the company.

Transit service
In 2013, the Seneca launched a public transit bus service to serve both the Cattaraugus and the western portion of the Allegany reservations; it operates one route, running along NY 438, NY 353, Old Route 17, I-86 and West Perimeter Road between Irving and Highbanks. The service is open to non-Seneca along the route.

Relationship with non-Seneca
Mary Jemison was the daughter of an Irish family who had settled in Pennsylvania. She was taken prisoner by Shawnee Indians during the French-and-Indian War.
Historical accounts recorded by Dr. James Seaver indicate that Jemison was adopted by a Seneca tribe and became assimilated. She married two Seneca men in succession, and raised their children in the Seneca culture.
She was known to act as a liaison between her newly adopted Seneca Nation and Old World-American settlers, particularly in explaining treaty agreements.

In 1995, the Seneca Nation of Indians sent a trade mission to Egypt in hopes to encourage trade between the Iroquois nation and the northeast African country. Seneca leaders also meet with OAPEC representatives to discuss a possible trade deal whereby the nation would trade agricultural commodities for Egyptian refined gasoline.

The nation claims authority to banish non-Seneca individuals from tribal lands; it has historically used this power in only rare circumstances, such as a December 2016 incident in which six non-natives were banished from the nation's territories, two of whom were banned for minor traffic violations and the other four for drug possession.

Exercising sovereignty over reservation lands
Since the later 20th century, the Seneca have been increasingly active in exercising sovereignty on their reservation and enforcing their property rights. Their relations with the non-Native surrounding population have become contentious, in regard to excise tax advantages and to their property rights.

In the 1990s, the Senecas won a prolonged court battle to assume ownership of all land on their reservation, including that owned by private non-Seneca. (This was particularly contentious in Salamanca, where non-Native landownership had been tolerated for decades. State and local officials said that this is the only United States city located on Indian reservation land; under the recognized law of the time, the underlying land remained Seneca owned, but "improvements" on that land were not subject to lease and were still privately owned.) The city had been developed under a 99-year federal lease arrangement with the Seneca Nation. It had provided land to railroads to encourage development, which the railroad developed for workers and their families, and related businesses. This arrangement was confirmed by acts of Congress in 1875, 1890 and 1990.

When that lease expired in 1991, the Seneca Nation demanded that the previous owners sign new leases with their nation for not only the underlying land, but also the improvements as well, or be evicted. The Seneca evicted fifteen property owners from their homes for refusing to sign over their properties. The increase in lease revenue from this reinterpretation has generated sufficient revenue for the nation to pay its enrolled members a quarterly social dividend, providing those members with a basic income.

In a similar case in 2012, the Seneca ordered an eviction of 80 residents of summer cottages at Snyder Beach on the Cattaraugus Reservation, a location near Sunset Bay. They had previously notified the owner of the land that his leases to non-Seneca were not permissible, but he had done nothing to clear his property. Some of the residents were from families who had rented there for decades. The Seneca described the non-Natives as constituting a long-standing "illegal occupation".

Culture
The Seneca were the largest of the six Native American nations that comprised the Iroquois Confederacy or Six Nations. Their democratic government pre-dated the United States Constitution.

In the Iroquois Confederacy, the Seneca were traditionally known as the "Keeper of the Western Door," for they are the westernmost of the Six Nations. In the Seneca language the people are known as O-non-dowa-gah, (pronounced: Oh-n'own-dough-wahgah) or "Great Hill People." At the time of the formation of the Iroquois League, the original five nations of the Iroquois League occupied large areas of land in Northeast North America, particularly present-day New York and Pennsylvania, and Southeast Canada. The historical Seneca occupied territory throughout the Finger Lakes area in Central New York, and in the Genesee Valley in Western New York, living in longhouses on the riversides. The villages were well fortified with wooden-stake palisade fences.

These were settled communities in which the people cultivated staple crops known as the Three Sisters: varieties of corn, beans, and squash, which were known as Deohako (pronounced: Jo- hay- ko), "the life supporters." Generally the women cultivated and processed the crops, maintaining seed crops and experimenting with varieties. Seneca men were subsistence hunters and fishers.

The Seneca were highly skilled at warfare, and were considered fierce adversaries by other Native Americans and European colonists. But the Seneca were also renowned for their sophisticated skills at diplomacy and oratory, and their willingness to unite with the other four of the original Five Nations to form the Iroquois Confederacy of Nations.

Today the Seneca Nation sustains its own people. Its enterprises benefit surrounding communities with a variety of cultural, educational and economic efforts. Its varied enterprises include: world-class casino gaming, hospitality and entertainment, which employ over 3,500 people; a convenience store chain (four stores), construction management, and diverse holdings in business ventures.

Seneca language, song, art, dance, and sports are all vital expressions of their culture. The number of fluent Seneca language speakers is diminishing due to the deaths of elders, and the language is considered at-risk. The Nation has established language programs to help protect, preserve and develop a new generation of Seneca-language speakers to keep the language alive.

Lacrosse is a sport played by male and female, young and old. Two new community sports complexes on each territory enable year-round lacrosse leagues and space for community programs, crafts and learning. Like other Iroquois tribes, Seneca Nation lacrosse players compete internationally on the Iroquois Nationals and Haudenosaunee Nationals squads, organized by the First Nations Lacrosse Association, which competes on par with fully sovereign nations such as the U.S. and Canada in international competition.

A Faithkeepers' School supports and ensures the ongoing practice of traditional teachings, arts, knowledge and the living culture of the Longhouse ways. The vibrancy of the rich Seneca heritage is evident in the ceremonies, practices, and cultural events that are infused with dance, music and song, arts, crafts and traditional foods that honor and celebrate Seneca culture.

Notable Seneca citizens

Governor Blacksnake (c.1740–1859), Seneca war chief, super-centenarian and savior of the Wenro Oil Spring
Cornplanter, (1750–1836), a Seneca of Dutch paternal descent (he used both the Seneca name Gaiantwake, which he received from his mother, and the European name John Abeel, from his father Johannes, grandson of former mayor of Albany Johannes Abeel), resided in what is now the Allegany Reservation in middle age. He became one of the Seneca's most trusted negotiators with the Americans of the new United States. In later age, Cornplanter was granted a large plot of land in Pennsylvania, an area that was flooded following construction of the Kinzua Dam in the mid-20th century. His descendants (among them Edward Cornplanter and Jesse Cornplanter) were influential members of the Seneca Nation. 
Maxine Crouse Dowler, teacher, first Seneca member on the Board of Education of the Cattaraugus-Allegany Board of Cooperative Educational Services	
 Traynor Ora Halftown (1917-2003), longtime children's TV show host at WPVI-TV in Philadelphia, known as Chief Halftown. He was also a professional bowler.
George Heron, former Nation president, opposed construction of Kinzua Dam.
 Bemus Pierce, an early professional football player and coach
Frank Pierce, early marathoner, first Indigenous athlete from United States to compete in the Olympics.
 Hawley Pierce, an early professional football player and coach
 Maris Bryant Pierce (1811–1874), chief, lawyer, land-rights activist
 Red Jacket (c. 1750–January 20, 1830), Chief of the wolf clan, a spokesperson for the Iroquois, who wanted his people to keep their culture and stay out of the colonial trade markets and remain neutral and peaceful.
Isaac Seneca, an early professional football player

See also
Seneca people
Cattaraugus Reservation
Seneca-Cayuga Tribe of Oklahoma
Tonawanda Band of Seneca Indians of New York
Seneca Nation of Indians v. Christy (1896)

Notes

References
 Pritzker, Barry M. A Native American Encyclopedia: History, Culture, and Peoples. Oxford: Oxford University Press, 2000. .
 Seneca Nation of New York, website
 "John elected president of the Seneca Nation", WIVB, 4 November 2014

Further reading
Joy A. Bilharz, The Allegany Senecas and Kinzua Dam: Forced Relocation through Two Generations, paperback, 2002
Laurence M. Hauptman, In the Shadow of Kinzua: The Seneca Nation of Indians since World War II'', Syracuse University Press, 2013

External links 
 Seneca Nation of New York, official website
 Seneca-Iroquois National Museum
 Seneca Nation of Indians: Division of Tourism

Native American tribes in New York (state)
Federally recognized tribes in the United States